Uma Bose (Hashi) (22 Jan 1921 - 22 Jan 1942) was a musical prodigy.

Early life
She was born in Calcutta to Prabha Bose (née Mitra) and Dharani Bose. Her father, who built the Mackinnon Mackenzie building in Calcutta and was a councillor of the Calcutta Municipal Corporation, belonged to an eminent family of builders. On the maternal side of her family, she was a great-granddaughter of Brajendranath De.

Career
She was a disciple of Dilipkumar Roy, with whom she composed several songs.

Such was her popularity, that Mahatma Gandhi once described her as 'The Nightingale of Bengal' in 1937.

Death
She died of tuberculosis on 22 January 1942, which was her 21st birthday.

Songs
Aaj Faguner Protham Diney (1938)
Aakasher Chand Matir Phuletey (1943)
Rupey Barney Gandhey (1940)
Key Tomarey Janatey Parey (1943)
Jibaney Maroney Esho (1940)
Chand Kahey Chameli Go Hey Nirupama (1938)
Jharano Patar Pathey (1938)
Neel Pori (1940)
Andharer Dorey Gatha (1941)
Prokitir Ghomtakhani Khol (1937)
Tomaye Guni Jeno Shuni (1937)
Rangajabaye Kaajki Ma Tore (1943)
Mon Tumi Krishi Kaaj Jano Na (1937)
Nirjharini (1940)
Aji Tomar Kachey Bhashiya Jayee (1937)
O Amar Mon Bholano (1939)
Modhu Murali Baajey (1940)

References

Bengali Hindus
Bengali singers
1921 births
1942 deaths
20th-century Indian musicians
Musicians from Kolkata